The yellow-eyed penguin (Megadyptes antipodes), known also as hoiho or tarakaka, is a species of penguin endemic to New Zealand.

Previously thought closely related to the little penguin (Eudyptula minor), molecular research has shown it more closely related to penguins of the genus Eudyptes. Like most other penguins, it is mainly piscivorous.

The species breeds along the eastern and south-eastern coastlines of the South Island of New Zealand, as well as Stewart Island, Auckland Islands, and Campbell Islands. Colonies on the Otago Peninsula are a popular tourist venue, where visitors may closely observe penguins from hides, trenches, or tunnels.

On the New Zealand mainland, the species has experienced a significant decline over the past 20 years. On the Otago Peninsula, numbers have dropped by 75% since the mid-1990s and population trends indicate the possibility of local extinction in the next 20 to 40 years.  While the effect of rising ocean temperatures is still being studied, an infectious outbreak in the mid 2000s played a large role in the drop. Human activities at sea (fisheries, pollution) may have an equal if not greater influence on the species' downward trend.

Taxonomy 
The yellow-eyed penguin was first described by Jacques Bernard Hombron and Honoré Jacquinot in 1841.

The yellow-eyed penguin is the sole extant species in the genus Megadyptes. A smaller, recently extinct species, the Waitaha penguin (M. waitaha), was described in 2009. A 2019 study recommended classifying the Waitaha penguin as M. a. waitaha, a subspecies of the extant yellow-eyed penguin. The same 2019 study described M. a. richdalei, a recently extinct dwarf subspecies from the Chatham Islands.

It was previously thought closely related to the little penguin but new molecular research has shown it is more closely related to penguins of the genus Eudyptes. Mitochondrial and nuclear DNA evidence suggests it split from the ancestors of Eudyptes around 15 million years ago. In 2019 the 1.25Gb genome of the species was published as part of the Penguin Genome Consortium, and this will help resolve the origins and aid conservation by helping to inform any future breeding programmes.

Description

Appearance 
The yellow-eyed penguin is most easily identified by the band of pale yellow feathers surrounding its eyes and encircling the back of its head. Its forehead, crown and the sides of its face are slate grey flecked with golden yellow. Its eye is yellow. The foreneck and sides of the head are light brown. The back and tail are slate blue-black. Its chest, stomach, thighs and the underside of its flippers are white in colour.

It is the largest living penguin to breed on the mainland of New Zealand and the fourth or fifth heaviest living penguin going on body mass. Weight varies throughout the year, with penguins being heaviest just before moulting, during which they may lose 3-4 kilograms in weight.

Juvenile birds have a greyer head with no yellow band around their eyes.

The yellow-eyed penguin may be long lived, with some individuals reaching 20 years of age. Males are generally longer lived than females, leading to a sex ratio of 2:1 around the age of 10–12 years.

Vocalizations 
The yellow-eyed penguin is mostly silent. It makes a shrill bray-like call at nest and breeding sites.

Distribution and habitat

Range 
Until recently, it was assumed that yellow-eyed penguins were widespread and abundant before the arrival of Polynesian settlers in New Zealand. However, genetic analysis has since revealed that its range only expanded to include mainland New Zealand in the past 200 years. Yellow-eyed penguins expanded out of the Subantarctic to replace New Zealand's endemic Waitaha penguin (M. waitaha). The Waitaha penguin became extinct between about 1300 and 1500, soon after Polynesian settlers arrived in New Zealand.  Dr Jeremy Austin, a member of the team that discovered the Waitaha penguin, said, "Our findings demonstrate that yellow-eyed penguins on mainland New Zealand are not a declining remnant of a previous abundant population, but came from the subantarctic relatively recently and replaced the extinct Waitaha penguin."

A dwarf subspecies from the Chatham Islands, M. a. richdalei, is extinct. The modern population of yellow-eyed penguins does not breed on the Chatham Islands. 

Today, yellow-eyed penguins are found in two distinct populations, known as the northern and southern populations.

The northern population extends along the southeast coast of the South Island of New Zealand, down to Stewart Island and Codfish Island. It includes four main breeding areas in Banks Peninsula, North Otago, Otago Peninsula and the Catlins. It may also be referred to as the mainland population.

The southern population includes the Subantarctic Auckland Islands and Campbell Island.

There is little gene flow between the northern and southern populations as the large stretch of ocean between the South Island and Subantarctic region and the subtropical convergence act as a natural barrier.

Behaviour

Feeding 

Around 90% of the yellow-eyed penguin's diet is made up of fish, chiefly demersal species that live near the seafloor, including silversides (Argentina elongata), blue cod (Parapercis colias), red cod (Pseudophycis bachus), and opalfish (Hemerocoetes monopterygius). Other species taken are New Zealand blueback sprat (Sprattus antipodum) and cephalopods such as arrow squid (Nototodarus sloanii). However, they also eat some crustaceans, including krill (Nyctiphanes australis). Recently, jellyfish were found to be targeted by the penguins. While initially thought that the birds would prey on jellyfish itself, deployments of camera loggers revealed that the penguins were going after juvenile fish and fish larvae associated with jellyfish.

Breeding penguins usually undertake two kinds of foraging trips: day trips where the birds leave at dawn and return in the evening ranging up to 25 km from their colonies, and shorter evening trips during which the birds are seldom away from their nest longer than four hours or range farther than 7 km. Yellow-eyed penguins are known to be an almost exclusive benthic forager that searches for prey along the seafloor. Accordingly, up to 90% of their dives are benthic dives. This also means that their average dive depths are determined by the water depths within their home ranges.

Breeding 

Whether yellow-eyed penguins are colonial nesters has been an ongoing point of debate among zoologists in New Zealand.  Most Antarctic penguin species nest in large, high density aggregations of birds; in contrast, yellow-eyed penguins do not nest within sight of each other. While they can be seen coming ashore in groups of four to six or more individuals, they then disperse along tracks to individual nest sites up to one kilometre inland. Accordingly, the consensus among New Zealand penguin workers is to use habitat rather than colony to refer to areas where yellow-eyed penguins nest.

Nest sites are selected in August and normally two eggs are laid in September. The incubation duties (lasting 39–51 days) are shared by both parents, who may spend several days on the nest at a time. For the first six weeks after hatching, the chicks are guarded during the day by one parent while the other is at sea feeding. The foraging adult returns at least daily to feed the chicks and relieve the partner.

After the chicks are six weeks of age, both parents go to sea to supply food to their rapidly growing offspring. Chicks usually fledge in mid-February and are totally independent from then on. Chick fledge weights are generally between 5 and 6 kg.

First breeding occurs at three to four years of age and long-term partnerships are formed.

Conservation
The yellow-eyed penguin is considered one of the rarest penguin species in the world. It is listed on the IUCN Red List as being endangered. It was first included on the list in 1988 when it was listed as threatened. Its status has since been changed to endangered in the year 2000.

It had an estimated population of 4000 in 2007. The main threats include habitat degradation and introduced predators. It may be the most ancient of all living penguins.

A reserve protecting more than 10% of the mainland population was established at Long Point in the Catlins in November 2007 by the Department of Conservation and the Yellow-eyed Penguin Trust.

In August 2010, the yellow-eyed penguin was granted protection under the U.S. Endangered Species Act.

Threats

Disease 

In spring 2004, a previously undescribed disease killed off 60% of yellow-eyed penguin chicks on the Otago peninsula and in North Otago. The disease has been linked to an infection of Corynebacterium, a genus of bacteria that also causes diphtheria in humans. It has been described as diphtheritic stomatitis and the pathogen identified.  A similar problem has affected the Stewart Island population. Treatment of chicks in hospital has proven successful with 88% of 41 chicks treated in 2022 surviving.

Tourism
Several mainland habitats have hides and are relatively accessible for those wishing to watch the birds come ashore. These include beaches at Oamaru, the Moeraki lighthouse, a number of beaches near Dunedin, and the Catlins.  In addition, commercial tourist operations on Otago Peninsula also provide hides to view yellow-eyed penguins. However, the yellow-eyed penguin cannot be found in zoos because it will not reproduce in captivity.

In culture 

The hoiho appears on the reverse side of the New Zealand five-dollar note.
The yellow-eyed penguin is the mascot to Dunedin City Council's recycling and solid waste management campaign.
The yellow-eyed penguin is also featured in Farce of the Penguins, in which they complain about global warming.
In 2019 the yellow-eyed penguin was crowned the Bird of the Year in New Zealand, the first win for a seabird in the competition's 14-year history.

References

External links

State of Penguins: Yellow-eyed penguin – detailed and current species account of (Megadyptes antipodes)
BBC Science and nature page about Megadyptes waitaha
Official Yellow-eyed Penguin Trust site in New Zealand
Yellow-eyed penguin on PenguinWorld
Yellow-eyed penguin facts at Penguins in New Zealand
penguinpage.net - Research blog about a project investigating yellow-eyed penguin foraging behaviour 
Yellow-eyed penguins from the International Penguin Conservation website

yellow-eyed penguin
Birds of the South Island
Birds of the Auckland Islands
Birds of the Campbell Islands
Otago Peninsula
yellow-eyed penguin
yellow-eyed penguin
yellow-eyed penguin
Articles containing video clips
Endemic birds of New Zealand
Yellow-eyed